Friedrich Wilhelm Rauschenberg (1 December 1853 – 28 September 1935) was a German architect active in Bremen, Germany.

Life
Rauschenberg was born in Bremen in 1853 and attended the local secondary school. After studying architecture, he opened offices in his home town offering designs in the Neo-Renaissance style. In 1891, he and Wilhelm Martens saw the completion of the Historicist styled Deutsche Bank building in Bremen.

In 1893, he spent a decade away, first in Munich and then in Karlsruhe. He returned in 1903 and set up in partnership, creating designs more in the Art Nouveau style.

Rauschenberg died in Bremen.

References

1853 births
1935 deaths
Architects from Bremen
19th-century German architects
Art Nouveau architects
20th-century German architects